Firefly Music Festival is a music festival produced by AEG Presents that was first held on July 20–22, 2012, in Dover, Delaware. Firefly takes place in The Woodlands of Dover Motor Speedway, a  festival ground, over the span of three days. Many nationally known musical acts have performed at the festival, with over 100 performances held over the course of the festival in 2016. The festival producers have been working together to establish the event at the current venue with the hopes of having "an open-air festival on the East Coast with plenty of outdoor camping". In past years the festival has included up to seven stages; The Porch Stage, The Lawn Stage, The Backyard Stage, the Treehouse, The Coffee House, The Pavilion and The Firefly Stage. In 2019, the festival had six main stages (The Firefly Stage, The Prism, The Lawn, The Hideaway, Treehouse, and The Roost), two sponsor stages (Bud Light Dive Bar, Toyota Music Den), and one stage in each camping hub (North Hub Beach Club, South Hub). Firefly offers three different pass options; general admission, VIP, and Super VIP.

The festival happened from 2012 through 2021 each year except for 2020, when it was canceled due to the COVID-19 pandemic. While it will not happen in 2023, they have indicated it will return in 2024.

Musical acts

2012
The headliners for the 2012 festival included Jack White, The Killers, and The Black Keys. Each performer played as the final act for a separate night of the festival on The Firefly Stage, the largest stage at the event. Other notable acts included Death Cab for Cutie, John Legend, Bassnectar, Modest Mouse, and The Flaming Lips. Although Passion Pit was listed as a musical act for 2012, their performance was canceled due to lead singer Michael Angelakos seeking ongoing treatment for bipolar disorder. Yeasayer was chosen as the replacement for Passion Pit's performance.

The 2012 schedule (artists listed from earliest to latest set times):
Friday, July 20

Firefly Main Stage: The Wallflowers, John Legend, Jack White
The Lawn: Heartless Bastards, OK Go, Bassnectar
The Backyard: Blind Pilot, Mayer Hawthorne & the County, Silversun Pickups
The Porch: Turf War, Matt Costa, Walk the Moon

Saturday, July 21

Firefly Main Stage: The Felice Brothers, Michael Franti & Spearhead, Young the Giant, Modest Mouse, The Killers
The Lawn: Ra Ra Riot, Poliça, Grouplove, Cake, Yeasayer
The Backyard: Imagine Dragons, Charles Bradley and His Extraordinaries, The Knocks, Chiddy Bang, Lupe Fiasco
The Porch: Moon Taxi, Kids These Days, Cults, Graffiti6, Trampled by Turtles

Sunday, July 22

Firefly Main Stage: The Head and the Heart, Cold War Kids, Death Cab for Cutie, The Black Keys
The Lawn: Penguin Prison, Awolnation, Fitz and the Tantrums, The Flaming Lips
The Backyard: J Roddy Walston and the Business, Bombay Bicycle Club, Tinie Tempah, Girl Talk
The Porch: Lower Case Blues, Reptar, Mariachi El Bronx, Allen Stone

2013
The headliners for the 2013 festival included Red Hot Chili Peppers, and Tom Petty and the Heartbreakers. Other notable acts included Vampire Weekend, Foster the People, Yeah Yeah Yeahs, The Avett Brothers, Calvin Harris, and Passion Pit.

Imagine Dragons was scheduled to be the only returning musical act between the 2012 and 2013 Firefly Music Festival. However, due to a scheduling conflict they had to cancel their performance and were replaced by Jim James. The Lumineers and Earl Sweatshirt were also scheduled to perform, but cancelled for medical reasons. Ben Harper and Charlie Musselwhite replaced The Lumineers while Schoolboy Q replaced Earl Sweatshirt in the lineup.

The 2013 schedule (artists listed from earliest to latest set times):
Friday, June 21

Firefly Main Stage: The Neighbourhood, Django Django, Dr. Dog, The Avett Brothers, Red Hot Chili Peppers
The Lawn: Leagues, Wild Belle, Atlas Genius, Ellie Goulding, Calvin Harris
The Backyard: JC Brooks & the Uptown Sound, Sister Sparrow & the Dirty Birds, Twenty One Pilots, The Joy Formidable, Public Enemy, Grizzly Bear, Krewella
The Porch: The Spinto Band, Conner Youngblood, Action Bronson, Foxygen, Dragonette, Schoolboy Q, Dan Deacon

Saturday, June 22

Firefly Main Stage: Japandroids, Jim James, Alabama Shakes, Yeah Yeah Yeahs, Tom Petty and the Heartbreakers
The Lawn: Kopecky Family Band, ZZ Ward, Kendrick Lamar, Edward Sharpe and the Magnetic Zeros, MGMT
The Backyard: Young Empires, Blondfire, He's My Brother She's My Sister, A Silent Film, Chvrches, Youngblood Hawke, Azealia Banks, Big Gigantic
The Porch: Imaginary Cities, Hey Marseilles, St. Lucia, Lord Huron, Crystal Fighters, Manufactured Superstars, The White Panda

Sunday, June 23

Firefly Main Stage: The Chevin, LP, Ben Harper and Charlie Musselwhite, Passion Pit, Foster the People
The Lawn: Selah Sue, Haim, Matt & Kim, Dispatch, Vampire Weekend
The Backyard: Delta Rae, The Apache Relay, The Last Bison, Kishi Bashi, Capital Cities, The Walkmen, Zedd
The Porch: The Last Royals, Trails and Ways, Wheeler Brothers, Robert DeLong, Toro y Moi, Amanda Palmer and the Grand Theft Orchestra

2014
On January 14, 2014, the lineup for 2014 was announced via the official Firefly YouTube channel. The headliners for 2014 included Outkast, Foo Fighters, and Jack Johnson with other notable acts Imagine Dragons, Beck, The Lumineers, Pretty Lights, Arctic Monkeys, Weezer and Broken Bells. Girl Talk, Twenty One Pilots, and Imagine Dragons returned for their second year performing at the festival.

The 2014 schedule (artists listed from earliest to latest set times):
Thursday, June 19

The Backyard: Andrew Belle, Kodaline, Phosphorescent, Local Natives
The Lawn: Parade of Lights, Courtney Barnett, Amos Lee
The Forest: John & Jacob, Aer, Gregory Alan Isakov, San Fermin, RAC

Friday, June 20

Firefly Main Stage: Kongos, Bleachers, Iron and Wine, Arctic Monkeys, Foo Fighters
The Backyard: Hunter Hunted, Ghost Beach, Sky Ferreira, Portugal. The Man, Young the Giant, Girl Talk
The Lawn: Basic Vacation, New Politics, American Authors, Chance the Rapper, Band of Horses
The Porch: The Secret Sisters, Vic Mensa, The Mowgli's, The Airborne Toxic Event, A-Trak, White Denim, Cash Cash
The Forest: Magic Man, Bronze Radio Return, Shakey Graves, The Jezabels, Son Lux
The Coffee House: Lily Mae, Cruiser, Courrier, Gregory Alan Isakov, High Highs, American Authors, Iron and Wine
The Big Break: Mean Lady, Saints of Valory, Step Rockets, Christian Porter

Saturday, June 21

Firefly Main Stage: Twenty One Pilots, Third Eye Blind, Grouplove, Imagine Dragons, Outkast
The Backyard: Bad Things, Smallpools, MS MR, Cage the Elephant, Tegan and Sara, Pretty Lights
The Lawn: The Ceremonies, Geographer, Lucius, Kaiser Chiefs, Tune-Yards, Beck
The Porch: Unlikely Candidates, Royal Teeth, Goldroom, Walk off the Earth, Sleigh Bells, The White Panda
The Forest: The Weeks, The Wild Feathers, Wild Child, Boy & Bear, Johnnyswim, X Ambassadors
The Coffee House: Wheeland Brothers, Speak, The Colourist, The Wild Feathers, Smallpools, Grouplove
The Big Break: New Sweden, Holychild, Kite String Tangle, Sleeper Agent, Stop Light Observations

Sunday, June 22

Firefly Main Stage: Dan Croll, City and Colour, Weezer, The Lumineers, Jack Johnson
The Backyard: Nonono, Jake Bugg, Ziggy Marley, Phantogram, Big Gigantic
The Lawn: Vance Joy, The Colourist, A Great Big World, Washed Out, Broken Bells, Childish Gambino
The Porch: Little Comets, Wild Cub, G-Eazy, Martin Garrix
The Forest: MisterWives, Haerts, Sir Sly, Cherub
The Coffee House: Casey Alvarez, Kawehi, Caroline Glaser, MisterWives, Jake Bugg
The Big Break: The Griswolds, Gemini Club, Little Daylight, Breach the Summit

2015
On February 17, 2015, the 2015 lineup was announced via the official Firefly YouTube channel. The headliners for 2015 included Paul McCartney, Kings of Leon and The Killers. The schedule of performances and locations were released on a date closer to the festival. Due to a severe thunderstorm on Saturday night of the 2015 festival, Kings of Leon had to cancel their performance and the festival grounds were temporarily evacuated. Charli XCX also had to cancel her Thursday performance, citing "personal reasons" in a statement.

The 2015 schedule (artists listed from earliest to latest set times):
Thursday, June 18

The Lawn: Young Rising Sons, Panama Wedding, Ryn Weaver, Jungle, The Kooks
The Backyard: Cypher Clique, Hey Rosetta!, Grizfolk, Twin Peaks, X Ambassadors
The Pavilion: Jack Novak, Kill Them with Colour, Nick Catchdubs, Solidisco, Sweater Beats, Tycho
The Coffee House: Josh Noren, Young Rising Sons, Grizfolk

Friday, June 19

Firefly Main Stage: Clean Bandit, Manchester Orchestra, Cage the Elephant, Morrissey, Paul McCartney
The Lawn: The Hunts, Knox Hamilton, Echosmith, Walk the Moon, Awolnation, Modest Mouse
The Backyard: Phoebe Ryan, Leif, Logic, Sylvan Esso, Big Data, Kygo, Zedd
The Pavilion: Styles & Complete, Eau Claire, Craze, Goshfather & Jinco, DJ Mustard, Odesza, Run the Jewels, How to Dress Well
The Porch: Wild Party, Wolf Alice, Colony House, Bear Hands, Chiddy Bang
The Forest: Fiancé, Cheerleader, Mother Mother, Captain Kidd, Glass Animals, Marian Hill
The Coffee House: Stetson Rose, Falls, Cody Simpson, Cheerleader, Manchester Orchestra, Echosmith

Saturday, June 20

Firefly Main Stage: Andrew McMahon, Gary Clark Jr., Matt & Kim, Foster the People
The Lawn: Joe Pug, Milo Greene, Zella Day, Sturgill Simpson, Spoon, Sublime with Rome
The Backyard: Intergalactix, The Griswolds, Jon Bellion, Betty Who, Dirty Heads, Kid Cudi, Steve Aoki
The Pavilion: Vindata, Manila Killa, Whyel, SNBRN, Jayceeoh, Alison Wonderland, The Chainsmokers, Matoma, Rustie
The Porch: Broncho, Skylar Spence, Halsey, Elliphant, Vacationer
The Forest: Kingsize, Lizzo, Night Terrors of 1927, Zola Jesus, Wind and the Wave, Lettuce
The Coffee House: Knox Hamilton, Phoebe Ryan, Andrew McMahon, CRUISR, Joe Pug, Betty Who, Milo Greene

Sunday, June 21

Firefly Main Stage: Cathedrals, Cold War Kids, Bastille, The Killers
The Lawn: Client Liaison, Generationals, Bahamas, Hozier, Snoop Dogg
The Backyard: Cardiknox, Max Frost, Steve Aoki, Benjamin Booker, Broods, Empire of the Sun, The White Panda
The Pavilion: Filibusta, Shaun Frank, Snakehips, Dizzy Wright, RJD2, Tove Lo, The Chainsmokers
The Porch: Børns, Vérité, Bad Suns, Citizen Cope
The Forest: Prinze George, Falls, PHOX, Raury
The Coffee House: Jeffrey James, Max Frost, Børns, Bahamas, Broods

2016
The 2016 lineup was released on November 18, 2015. Headliners included Mumford & Sons, Kings of Leon, Florence and the Machine, and deadmau5. Two Door Cinema Club served as the Thursday night headliner.

The official alphabetical 2016 lineup was as follows: 

ASAP Rocky
AlunaGeorge
AMFMS
Arkells
Atlas Genius
Blink-182
BOT
Boy & Bear
Chvrches
Catfish and the Bottlemen
Caverns
Chairlift
Cheat Codes
Circa Waves
City of the Sun
Civil Twilight
Cleopold
Cobi
Coin
Coleman Hell
Connell Cruise
DRAM
Deadmau5
Death Cab For Cutie
Dirty Dishes
Disclosure
Earth, Wind & Fire
Elle King
Ellie Goulding
Elliot Root
Felix Jaehn
Fetty Wap
Finish Ticket
Fitz and the Tantrums
Flogging Molly
Florence and the Machine
Gallant
Generik
Gibbz
Gnash
GoldLink
Grouplove
Guster
Hayden James
Heydaze
Hippie Sabotage
Hollis Brown
Isaac Gracie
Jack Garratt
Jahkoy
Jai Wolf
James Hersey
Jeremy Loops
Kaleo (they never performed at the festival; just on lineup)
Kaneholler
Kings of Leon
Kittens
LANY
Laura Stevenson
Lauv
Louis the Child
Ludacris
M83
Mail the Horse
Major and the Monbacks
Major Lazer
Marc Scibilia
Mike Rocket
Moon Taxi
Motel Radio
Mumford & Sons
MØ
Nathaniel Rateliff & The Night Sweats
New Sound Brass Band
Night Riots
Noah Gundersen
Of Monsters and Men
Oh Wonder
Parson James
Pell
Pepper
Porter Robinson
Powers
PVRIS
Quilt
Robert DeLong
Rüfüs Du Sol
Saint Motel
Sam James
Sigala
Skizzy Mars
Slaptop
Son Little
St. Lucia
Strangers You Know
Sun Club
Swim Deep
Tame Impala
Tchami
Teen Men
The 1975
The Lonely Biscuits
The Moth and the Flame (added to lineup late) 
The Neighbourhood
The Shelters
The Staves
The Struts
The White Panda
The Wombats
Transviolet
Trombone Shorty & Orleans Avenue
Twin Limb
Two Door Cinema Club
Tyler Boone
Vanic
Vince Staples
Weathers
Wet
Whilk & Misky
William Bolton

2017 
Headliners included The Weeknd, Muse, Twenty One Pilots, Chance the Rapper and Bob Dylan. Glass Animals served as the Thursday night headliner.

The official alphabetized 2017 lineup was as follows: 

*repeat repeat
888 
AFI 
Alan Walker 
Alex Wiley 
Andy Frasco & the U.N. 
Animal Years 
Anna Lunoe 
Anna Shoemaker 
Arizona
Armani Lee 
Astro 8000 
Ayokay
Banks 
Barns Courtney 
Bencoolen 
Benny Benassi 
Big Wild 
Bishop Briggs 
Bleachers 
Blossoms 
Bob Dylan and His Band
Bob Moses
Busta Rhymes 
Capital Cities 
Carverton 
Cashmere Cat 
Chance The Rapper
Chill Moody 
Cold Roses 
Crywolf 
CVBZ 
Daya
Dead Man Fall 
Deal Casino 
Dillon Francis 
DJ Jazzy Jeff 
Dreamers 
Dude Ranch & The Girl at the Rock Show 
Eden
Elohim 
Fickle Friends 
 Fletcher
Flume
Foreign Air 
Francis & The Lights
Franz Ferdinand 
Future Generations 
Galantis 
Glass Animals 
Goody Grace 
Gryffin 
Hamilton Leithauser 
Hamish Anderson 
Handsome Ghost
Hardwork Movement 
HDBEENDOPE 
Illenium 
Ill Fated Natives 
Jacob Banks 
James TW 
Jared & The Mill 
Joie Kathos 
Jonas Blue 
Judah & the Lion
K.Flay 
Kaiydo 
Kaleo 
Kesha 
Kevin Garrett 
Lawrence 
Lewis Del Mar 
Lil Dicky 
Louie Louie 
Luke O'Brien 
Maggie Rogers (singer)
MAGIC GIANT 
Matoma
 
Meg Mac 
Michael Blume 
Miike Snow 
Miles Chancellor 
Mir Fontane 
Misterwives 
Mondo Cozmo 
Muna 
MUSE
Nahko and Medicine for the People 
NAWAS 
New Madrid 
NF (rapper) 
O.A.R. 
OddKidOut 
OK GO 
OWEL 
Pardison Fontaine
Phantogram
Quinn XCII 
Quitehype 
 Rainbow Kitten Surprise
Roadkill Ghost Choir 
Rozes 
Saint Wknd 
Salt Cathedral 
Sam Feldt 
Savoir Adore 
Secret Weapons 
Shaed 
Shizz Lo 
Short Sleeve Heart 
Sir Sly 
Sir The Baptist 
Slushii 
Snakehips 
Sofi Tukker 
Spiritual Rez 
Steve James
 
Stick Figure 
Sub-Radio 
Sunflower Bean 
T-Pain
Taylor Bennett
The Lawsuits 
The Naked and Famous
The Orphan The Poet 
The Shins 
The Social Animals 
The Steppin Stones 
The Strumbellas 
The Weeknd
The White Panda 
Thirty Seconds To Mars 
Tory Lanez 
Trio
Twenty One Pilots
Vita and the Woolf 
Wale
Walker Lukens 
Warm Brew 
Weezer
Wilderado 
Win and Woo 
Young Bombs

2018 

The 2018 Firefly Music Festival continued to be a four-day event starting June 14 and lasting through June 17 with headliners that included: Eminem, Kendrick Lamar, Arctic Monkeys, The Killers, ODESZA, Lil Wayne, Logic, SZA, Martin Garrix, and Alt-J.

2019 

The 2019 Firefly Music Festival returned to being a three-day event starting June 21 and lasting through June 23 with headliners that included: Panic! at the Disco, Travis Scott, and Post Malone. Other major performers included Kygo, Tyler the Creator, Vampire Weekend, DJ Snake, ZEDD, Death Cab for Cutie, Brockhampton, Courtney Barnett, TLC, Lykke Li, Lauren Daigle, Alison Wonderland, King Princess, Jessie Reyez, and Tank and the Bangas.

2020
The 2020 Firefly Music Festival was scheduled to be held from June 18 to 21, but was canceled on March 24 due to the COVID-19 pandemic.

2021 

The 2021 Firefly Music Festival was announced on March 29, 2021, to be held from September 23 to 26. 

Many food venues to pick from during all three days of the festival along with, set times that may be switched around or changed due to something with the artist performing.

2022

2023

While the festival will not happen in 2023, they have indicated it will return in 2024.

Activities 
In addition to musical acts, The Firefly Music Festival offers other activities. An arcade tent is set up, which houses arcade and video games. Attendees can design their own pair of Toms Shoes and have an artist paint the design. With the purchase of the custom pair of shoes, an additional pair of Toms is sent to a child in need, through the Toms One For One Movement program. The Hammock Hangout is a shaded area in which you can sit or lay down in a hammock. The Pathway is a wooded path that connects the two "halves" of the festival. Each year, The Pathway has a theme, and as of the 2017 festival, fans get to choose what that happens to be.

The Thicket is another attraction at Firefly, where attendees can participate in a silent rave.  For everyone with headphones on, however; the Thicket music filled, with DJs playing music that can only be heard through the headphones. The Coffee House offers a multiple café-style vendors, and music performances throughout the day.

In its first year, Firefly featured hot air balloon rides over The Woodlands. The rides are no longer offered to Festival goers, but the hot air balloon remains as an iconic symbol of Firefly.

Firefly partners with Delaware's Dogfish Head Brewery to have The Brewery, an onsite beer bar. The bar serves Firefly Ale, a microbrew Dogfish Head Pale Ale makes specifically for the festival.

Firefly also offers various charging stations, where attendees can charge electronic devices.

Starting in February 2015, there is also an annual unofficial weekend long fan get together in Dewey Beach, Delaware. Called Winterfly, the event is un-associated with Goldenvoice or Red Frog Events, but features live music, and group activities such as a private tour of the Dogfishhead Brewery and charitable auctions that benefit local music programs.

Lodging 
A number of lodging options exist at the festival. Attendees of the festival can choose to camp in a tent or RV in what Firefly calls The Grove. Additionally, attendees can choose "glamping", a portmanteau of the words "glamorous" and "camping". Some glamping options provide private, air-conditioned tents, beds with sheets, access to private and air-conditioned showers and bathrooms, access to a private food lounge, as well as food and snack vouchers for inside the festival.

After the 2017 Las Vegas shooting, event security worked with the Dover Police Department, Delaware State Police, DelDOT and the Kent County Department of Safety to create security plans. Walk through metal-detectors were installed at points of entry, with bomb detection dogs also posted at each entry.

Environmentalism 
Firefly Music Festival promotes itself as a sustainable and environmentally friendly festival, with its program Sustainable Beats. A part of this program includes carbon footprint offsetting with ticket purchases. Attendees of the festival have the option of donating to the carbon footprint offsetting program when purchasing their tickets online, which allows each attendee to offset 440 pounds of carbon dioxide. The festival matches each of these donations up until the festival is completely carbon neutral. In 2012, this program offset over 1.5 million pounds of carbon dioxide. Additionally, water refill stations are found throughout The Woodlands, reusable water bottles are sold at the concert and encouraged to concert attendees, and the festival participates in a waste diversion program to reduce the amount of trash from the festival that ends up in a landfill.

Partners 
Firefly and Red Frog Events have partnered with St. Jude's Music Gives to St. Jude Kids program to "enlist artists large and small, emerging and established, to join St. Jude in the fight against childhood cancer." This program includes having a tent for donations at the event, having meet-and-greet events with various performers at the concert, and other ways of fundraising for the program. In 2012, Firefly attendees raised over $4.6 million for Music Gives to St. Jude Kids. In addition, Firefly partners with Bud Light, Jack Daniel's, Tito's Vodka, StubHub, AXS TV, Cupcake Vineyards, Alex and Ani, Fye, Dogfish Head, Camelback, El Jimador, and Garnier. As of 2015, Sirius XM's Alt Nation has broadcast multiple Firefly performances throughout the festival.

References

External links

Past lineups

Indie rock festivals
Electronic music festivals in the United States
Rock festivals in the United States
Music festivals in Delaware
Tourist attractions in Dover, Delaware
Music festivals established in 2012